Mark Gilbert McKinney, known professionally as Gil McKinney, (born February 5, 1979 in Houston, Texas) is an American film and television actor.

He is best known for playing Dr. Paul Grady on ER, Derek Bishop on Friday Night Lights, and Prince Eric in Once Upon a Time, and for being the voice and face (via MotionScan) of Jack Kelso in the video game L.A. Noire. Gil also appeared in Supernatural as Henry Winchester.

Filmography

Film

Television

Video Game

References

External links
 

1979 births
Living people
American male film actors
People from Houston
American male television actors
21st-century American male actors